12 posyolok is a rural locality (a settlement) in Shatura Urban Settlement of Shatursky District, Russia. The population was 159 . To the north of the village in 1941-1943. There was a landing site of the 16th Guards Fighter Aviation Regiment, later used for agricultural aircraft. To the south of the village was the substation of the power supply of the Shatursky peat enterprise.

Geography 
12 posyolok is located 269 km northwest of Shatura (the district's administrative centre) by road.

Streets 
There are no streets with titles.

References 

Rural localities in Moscow Oblast
Shatursky District